The Journal of Economic Inequality is a quarterly peer-reviewed academic journal covering the study of economic and social inequality. It was established in 2003 and is published by Springer Science+Business Media. The editor-in-chief is Frank Cowell (London School of Economics and Political Science). According to the Journal Citation Reports, the journal has a 2017 impact factor of 0.980.

References

External links

Economics journals
Works about economic inequality
Springer Science+Business Media academic journals
Quarterly journals
Publications established in 2003
English-language journals